Gavare's eXperimental Emulator (formerly known as mips64emul) is a computer architecture
emulator being developed by Anders Gavare. It is
available as free software under a revised BSD-style license.
In 2005, Gavare changed the name of the software project
from mips64emul to GXemul. This was to avoid giving the impression that the emulator
was confined to the MIPS architecture, which was the
only architecture being emulated initially.

Although development of the emulator is still a work-in-progress, since 2004 it
has been stable enough to let various unmodified guest operating systems run
as if they were running on real hardware. Currently emulated processor architectures include
ARM, MIPS, M88K, PowerPC, and SuperH.
Guest operating systems that have been verified to work inside the emulator
are NetBSD, OpenBSD, Linux, HelenOS, Ultrix, and
Sprite.

Apart from running entire guest operating systems, the emulator can also be used
for experiments on a smaller scale, such as hobby operating system
development, or it can be used as a general debugger.

Dynamic translation 
GXemul's processor emulation uses dynamic translation, to convert the
emulated processor's instructions into an intermediate representation (IR).
The IR is in a format which can be executed by the host. In other words, it
should be possible to port the emulator to new host architectures with just
a recompilation; there is no need to implement a native code generation backend
for each host architecture to get it running.

See also 

 QEMU
 SIMH
 PearPC
 Bochs
 Comparison of platform virtualization software

External links 
 The GXemul homepage
 NetBSD's Emulator page

Free emulation software
Multi-emulators
PowerPC emulators